The Mbadja or Ovambadja is a group of an independent tribe that speaks Oshimbadja language. They originated from Ombadja (Município de Ombadja) in southern Angola, Cunene Province (Província do Cunene).

About 20% of the Mbadja people migrated from south Angola during the years of 1900 into the northern part of Namibia. They occupied an area of land that they named "Okalongo", which translates to "a small country". Although they may confused by some people with the Wambo or Ovawambo tribes, because of their similar way of speaking, the Mbadja people were never recognized as such among the traditional seven Owambo tribes, listed as Kwanyama, Ndonga, Ngandjera, Kwaluudhi, Kolonkadhi, Mbalanhu and Kwambi. The Mbadja are also referred to as "Ovambadja vaNaushona".

Some of the Ovambadja stay in Okalongo in the Omusati region, Namibia. Like other African tribes, the Mbadja people raise cattle, goats, sheep, pigs and chicken. They cultivate the land to grow omahangu, maize, sorghum, beans, peanuts and watermelons during the rainy season.

Mbadja is part of the Bantu people.they are angolans ,
 The Mbadja ancestors told stories of their origins that tells that they have migrated from "The Land of the Lakes" and moved south centuries ago. It is suspected that the place they refer to is around Lake Tanganyika in Tanzania.

Ethnic groups in Angola